Islas is a surname. Notable people with the surname include:

Arturo Islas (1938–1991), professor of English and a novelist from Texas
Daniel Islas (born 1979), Argentine football goalkeeper
Luis Islas (born 1965), former football goalkeeper
Mauricio Islas (born 1973), Mexican actor best known for his work in telenovelas
Sabino Islas (born 1917), Mexican boxer who competed in the 1936 Summer Olympics
Therese Islas Helgesson (born 1983), Swedish handball player

See also
Isla (disambiguation)

es:Islas